Neodactria modestellus is a moth in the family Crambidae. It was described by William Barnes and James Halliday McDunnough in 1918. It is found in North America, where it has been recorded from Texas.

References

Crambini
Moths described in 1918
Moths of North America